Terry Lee Bruce (born March 25, 1944) is an American politician, lawyer, and educator from Illinois.

Early life
Bruce was born in Olney, Illinois on March 25, 1944. He attended the University of Illinois at Urbana-Champaign and then later the University of Illinois College of Law. He worked for a time at the United States Department of Labor on issues related to farmworkers and as an intern on the staff of Tom McGloon. He also worked on the staffs of Congressman George Shipley and State Senator Philip Benefiel.

He was admitted to the bar in 1969. When he announced his candidacy for the Illinois Senate in November 1969, he was occupied as an attorney in Olney, Illinois.

State Senate
Bruce's initial election to the Illinois Senate representing the 55th District in 1971 was in part made possible by the retirement of the incumbent, Paul W. Broyles. In 1972, the incumbent Bruce faced a challenge from Henry Hendren for representation of the 54th district.

While in the Senate, he was a leader of the Democratic Study Group which he jokingly termed the "Crazy 8". In 1977, Bruce ran against Thomas Hynes to succeed Cecil Partee as President of the Illinois Senate. After 186 ballots, Hynes was victorious over the other Democratic faction and the Republican caucus.

Bruce served as member of the Illinois Senate from 1971–84, and assistant majority leader from 1975–84. In 1981, Bruce was among those who opposed an "eleventh-hour action", ultimately accepted, to increase Illinois General Assembly compensation. Bruce resigned from the Illinois Senate effective January 3, 1985. Local Democratic leaders appointed former state legislator William L. O'Daniel to the vacancy created by Bruce's resignation.

Congress
In 1977, Democratic incumbent George E. Shipley chose to retire after ten terms in the United States House of Representatives rather than run in the 1978 election. Bruce defeated Don Watson, Shipley's brother-in-law, for the Democratic nomination to succeed Shipley in Illinois's 22nd congressional district. Subsequently, in the general election there was an apathy towards Bruce's candidacy. Republican candidate Dan Crane, the brother of Chicago-area Congressman Phil Crane, was able to win several Democratic strongholds in the 22nd and the election.

On July 14, 1983, the House Ethics Committee recommended that Crane be reprimanded for having engaged in a sexual relationship a 17-year-old female house page. In the 1984 United States House of Representatives election, Bruce defeated Crane.

Bruce was elected to the Ninety-ninth and to the three succeeding Congresses and served as United States Representative for Illinois's 19th congressional district from January 3, 1985 to January 3, 1993. He was an unsuccessful candidate for renomination in 1992 to the 103rd Congress.

Community college career
From 1996 to 2019 Bruce served as the chief executive officer of Illinois Eastern Community Colleges (IECC). The four college system includes Wabash Valley College in Mount Carmel, Olney Central College in Olney, Lincoln Trail College in Robinson, and Frontier Community College in Fairfield.

Governor Pat Quinn appointed him to the Illinois Community College Board (ICCB) in September 2012. He replaced former ICCB member Dianne Meeks. He still serves on the board with an expiring term of June 30, 2021. He at one point served as Vice Chairman of the board. Bruce was appointed again to the ICCB by Governor Bruce Rauner for a term March 20, 2015 until June 30, 2015 to succeed Rodolfo Valdez.

Family life
A resident of Olney, Illinois, Bruce is married to Charlotte and they have two daughters, Emily and Ellen.

References

External links

 

|-

|-

|-

1944 births
Living people
Democratic Party Illinois state senators
Democratic Party members of the United States House of Representatives from Illinois
University of Illinois College of Law alumni
People from Olney, Illinois
Illinois lawyers